Khoon Ki Pukaar is a 1978 Bollywood action film drama directed by Ramesh Ahuja. The film stars Vinod Khanna, Shabana Azmi in lead roles.

Plot
After the murder of his wife, and his son's kidnapping, Dr. Vidya Bhushan decides to devote the rest of his life as a Poojary, living on the premises of a princely-donated temple, hoping and praying that one day he will be reunited with his estranged son. One day a wounded bandit named Sher Singh comes to him for protection, and he not only shields the man from the police, but also tends to his wounds, and lies to the townspeople that the man's name is Amrit, When Amrit recovers, he is grateful to Vidya for looking after him, and he falls in love with a town belle by the name of Shano. What Vidya does not know that is that Amrit is really interested in the gold and jewellery hidden in a secret underground chamber below the temple; and what Amrit does not know is Shalu is seeking vengeance against Sher Singh for killing her father.

Cast
Vinod Khanna as Amrit / Sher Singh 
Shabana Azmi as Shanno
Aruna Irani as Bijli
Pran as Dr. Vidya Bhushan / Poojari
Amjad Khan as Zalim Singh / Sardar
Iftekhar as Khan
Roopesh Kumar as Bheema
Rita Bhaduri as Rani

Soundtrack

External links
 

1978 films
1970s Hindi-language films
1978 action films
Films scored by Bappi Lahiri
Indian action films